Matthew Spender (born 1945) is an English sculptor. He is the author of From a High Place: A Life of Arshile Gorky (1999), a biography of his father-in-law, the artist Arshile Gorky, and A House in St John's Wood (2015), about his father, the poet Stephen Spender.  He also wrote Within Tuscany: Reflections on a Time and Place (1992, Viking, and 1993, Penguin.)

Spender was born in London, England, the son of the poet Stephen Spender and the pianist Natasha Spender.

References

English sculptors
English male sculptors
English Jews
Jewish sculptors
Male biographers
20th-century British sculptors
20th-century biographers
20th-century English writers
21st-century British sculptors
21st-century male artists
21st-century biographers
21st-century English writers
Living people
1945 births
Date of birth missing (living people)
20th-century English male writers